In formal language theory, the Chomsky–Schützenberger representation theorem is a theorem derived by Noam Chomsky and Marcel-Paul Schützenberger about representing a given context-free language in terms of two simpler languages. These two simpler languages, namely a regular language and a Dyck language, are combined by means of an intersection and a homomorphism.

A few notions from formal language theory are in order. A context-free language is regular, if can be described by a regular expression, or, equivalently, if it is accepted by a finite automaton. A matched alphabet  is an alphabet with two equal-sized sets; it is convenient to think of it as a set of parentheses types, where  contains the opening parenthesis symbols, whereas the symbols in  contains the closing parenthesis symbols. For a matched alphabet , the Dyck language  is given by

Chomsky–Schützenberger theorem. A language L over the alphabet  is context-free if and only if there exists
 a matched alphabet 
 and a homomorphism  
such that .

References

 

Noam Chomsky
Formal languages
Theorems in discrete mathematics